Arturo Amos (March 6, 1927 – September 29, 1999)  was an Argentine gymnast who competed in the 1948 Summer Olympics.

References

1927 births
1999 deaths
Argentine male artistic gymnasts
Gymnasts at the 1948 Summer Olympics
Olympic gymnasts of Argentina
Sportspeople from Buenos Aires Province